Myo Ko Ko San (born 1 September 1994) is a Burmese transgender model, LGBT rights activist and beauty pageant titleholder who was elected Miss International Queen Myanmar 2014 and represented Myanmar at the Miss International Queen 2014. On 19 June 2018, she won the ASEAN - LGBT Community Pride Awards 2018.

Early life and education
Myo Ko Ko San was born on 1 September 1994 in Mandalay, Myanmar, as a boy. She is the second child among three siblings, having a younger brother and an older brother. She experienced gender dysphoria beginning in early childhood, and began her gender transition at the age of 15 while attending school. She completed her sex reassignment surgery in Thailand at the age of 23. She studied civil engineering at Technological University, Mandalay.

Pageantry

Miss Rainbow Ribbon 2013
In 2013, she competed in Miss Rainbow Ribbon 2013, a pageant for transgender women which was held on 23 October 2013 at the Hotel Mandalay by Rainbow Ribbon Network Myanmar. After winning the event, she was elected to represent Myanmar for Miss International Queen 2014, the world's largest beauty pageant for transgender women.

Miss International Queen 2014
She represented Myanmar at the Miss International Queen 2014 pageant which was held on 7 November 2014 in Pattaya, Thailand, along with participants from 20 other nations. She was the 1st runner-up for Talent.

Miss Universe Myanmar 2022
Myo Ko Ko San is the first transgender woman to compete in Miss Universe Myanmar Pageant. She placed at top 10 in Miss Universe Myanmar 2022.

Career
After previously competing in the Miss International Queen 2014 pageant, she was recognized as Miss International Queen Myanmar, and became a transgender supermodel and actress. 

Myo is set to be in the first Burmese transgender film. The film, currently untitled, will portray a transgender person who stands up for her rights even to the point of death.

Arrest under section 66 (d)
Myo Ko Ko San was sued under section 66 (d) of the telecommunications law by actress Wutt Hmone Shwe Yi, who filed a lawsuit against Myo for defamation, accusing Myo of being the administrator of Cele Cele Small, a Facebook page which posted allegedly defamatory material towards the actress. Cele Cele Small was a Facebook page with over 1 million likes that reveals inside information on the private lives of Myanmar’s celebrities and artists. Police took the model into custody at Yangon International Airport on her return from a visit to Bangkok, Thailand, and she was held at the Yankin Township Police Station on 17 January 2017.

Aftermath
In Yankin Township Court, Myo Ko Ko San denied involvement with the Facebook group and questioned why the police had the right to arrest her without strong evidence. After four days in jail, Myo Ko Ko San was released and the defamation case against her was declared spurious as investigating officers found insufficient evidence to support the lawsuit.

LGBT activism
Myo is an icon of Myanmar LGBTs and an advocate for LGBT rights in Myanmar. She has appeared in many campaigns for LGBT rights activism. Myo’s hope is that she can help educate people to learn more about LGBT issues and bring them towards a higher understanding.

References

External links

1994 births
Living people
Burmese beauty pageant winners
Transgender actresses
Transgender female models
People from Mandalay
Burmese LGBT people
Burmese LGBT rights activists